The Campeonato Carioca Série B1 is the football third level of the First Division annual competition among clubs in the state of Rio de Janeiro, Brazil. Usually, the champion of the level is promoted in the next season to the Campeonato Carioca. It is under the authority of the FERJ or FFERJ (Football Federation of the State of Rio de Janeiro).

List of champions

Following is the list with all the champions of the third level of Rio de Janeiro and their different nomenclatures over the years.

Distrito Federal do Rio de Janeiro

Terceira Divisão

Estado do Rio de Janeiro

Terceira Divisão

Segunda Divisão

Divisão Intermediária

Módulo Especial

Terceira Divisão

Série C

Série B2

Série B1

Notes

Porto Alegre is the currently Itaperuna EC.
Barreira is the currently Boavista SC.
Botafogo de Macaé is the currently Macaé EFC.
Independente is the currently Serra Macaense FC
Rio de Janeiro is the currently CFZ do Rio.
Sendas is the currently Audax Rio
AA Cabofriense was refounded as AD Cabofriense in 1997 by the same directors with the aim of separating football from the social club activities.

Titles by team

Teams in bold are still active.

By city

See also
 Campeonato Carioca Série A1
 Campeonato Carioca Série A2
 Campeonato Carioca Série B2
 Campeonato Carioca Série C

References

External links
  FFERJ website
 Second Level champions at RSSSF
 Third Level champions at RSSSF
 Best Attendances in Campeonato Carioca at RSSSF
 Matches when cariocas titles were decided in Laranjeiras Stadium at RSSSF